The Tremont Theatre (est. 1889) was a playhouse in Boston, Massachusetts, in the late 19th and early 20th centuries. Henry E. Abbey and John B. Schoeffel established the enterprise and oversaw construction of its building at no.176 Tremont Street in the Boston Theater District area. Managers included Abbey, Schoeffel and Grau, Klaw & Erlanger, Thos. B. Lothan and Albert M. Sheehan.

A traveller's guidebook described the space in 1899: "The auditorium is 75 feet high of the same width and 80 feet deep. It is fashioned on the plan of a mammoth shell. ... The ten oddly fashioned private boxes on either side of the proscenium give a novel effect to the interior. The decoration of the main ceiling is modernized Renaissance treated in Gobelin tapestry effect and the coloring of the walls is in harmonizing shades. The stage is 73 by 45 feet, with a height of 69 feet to the rigging loft. The house has 2,000 seats."

"In 1947 the Tremont became a movie theater named the Astor and briefly, before its demise, a juice bar." "After a fire in 1983, the building was demolished." "AMC Boston Common 19 Movie Theater now occupies the site."

Performances

1880s–1890s 
 Justin McCarthy's "The Candidate," with Charles Wyndham and Mary Moore
 Sarah Bernhardt
1492 Up to Date, presented by Edward E. Rice's "Surprise party"
 Pauline Hall's "Puritania," music by Edgar Stillman Kelley
 "Niobe," with Abbott & Teal's comedy co.
 Garrett P. Serviss' "Wonders of America"
 W.S. Gilbert's "His Excellency," with George Edwardes' Comic Opera Co.
 "Two Little Vagrants"
 J.M. Barrie's "The Professors Love Story," with E.S. Willard
 "Half a King," with Francis Wilson
 Augustus Thomas' "The Hoosier Doctor," with Digby Bell
 Augustus Thomas' "The Jucklins," with Stuart Robson
 DeWolf Hopper and the Boston Cadet Band
 De Koven and Smith's "The Highwayman," with Broadway Theatre Opera Co.

1900s 
 Pixley & Luders' "Prince of Pilsen"
 Winston Churchill's "The Crisis," with James K. Hackett
 Roland MacDonald's "The Sword of the King," with Henrietta Crosman
 David Belasco & John Luther Long's "Darling of the Gods," with Blanche Bates
 "Mr. Pickwick," with DeWolf Hopper
 The Cingalee, with Augustin Daily Musical Co.
 Jesse Lynch Williams' "The Stolen Story"
 De Koven's "The Student King"
 Geo. Broadhurst's "Man of the Hour"
 Kitty Grey
 "A Knight for a Day"

1910s 
 Ziegfeld Follies
 Cohan's "7 Keys to Baldpate"
 D.W. Griffith's The Birth of a Nation
 Harry James Smith's "A Tailor-Made Man," with Grant Mitchell
 "Three Faces East"
 Winchell Smith and John E. Hazzards's  "Turn to the Right" with Edgar Nelson and Jason Robards, September 17, 1917

1920s 
 Ed Wynn Carnival
 Little Nellie Kelly
 The O'Brien Girl
 "Just A Minute" Phil Morris and H.C Greene -"11 scenes and 90 people"
 Avery Hopwood's "The Gold Diggers"
 "Shavings," with Harry Beresford
 "Captain Applejack," with Wallace Eddinger and Mary Nash
 "The Girl in the Spotlight"

1930s-1940s 

 Green Grow the Lilacs
 "Confidential Service"
 "Divorce Me, Dear"

Images

References

External links 

 Bostonian Society.
 Photo of Tremont Street parade, c. 1939–1941, with glimpse of the Tremont theatre sign
 Horse-drawn fire equipment on parade, corner of Boylston Street and Tremont Street, c. 1939–1941, with glimpse of the Tremont theatre sign
 Historic New England
 Postcard for Potash & Perlmutter, Tremont Theatre, Boston, Mass., undated
 Tremont Theatre, Boston, Mass. postcard, c. 1907. Postmarked: August 5, 1911.
 Boston Athenaeum. Tremont Theatre programs, 1890–1903

Cultural history of Boston
19th century in Boston
20th century in Boston
Boston Theater District
1889 establishments in Massachusetts
Former theatres in Boston
Event venues established in 1889
Former cinemas in the United States
Loew's Theatres buildings and structures